Daniel (Schou) Granstedt, guitarist and member of the Swedish metal band Headplate.
He has also co-produced, mixed and recorded all their three albums. And also worked with Hardcore Superstar, Brassmonkey and Absent among others.

Discography

1998: Brassmonkey - Brassmonkey — engineering
1998: Hardcore Superstar - It's Only Rock'n'Roll — engineering
2000: Headplate - Bullsized — guitars, engineering, mixing, production
2002: Headplate - Delicate — guitars, engineering, mixing, production
2003: Headplate - Pieces — guitars, engineering, mixing, production
2006: Absent - Euphoria — engineering, mixing, production
2012: Red Bled The Sun - I — engineering, mixing, production
2012: Headplate - 12-12-12 — engineering, mixing, mastering, production
2013: Benevolent - The Wave — engineering, mixing, production

External links
Official Headplate Website

1975 births
Living people
Swedish record producers
Swedish heavy metal guitarists
21st-century guitarists